Zdole is a settlement in the Municipality of Kozje in eastern Slovenia. It lies in the hills just north of Kozje. The area is part of the historical Styria region. The municipality is now included in the Savinja Statistical Region.

References

External links
Zdole on Geopedia

Populated places in the Municipality of Kozje